Nur Fathia binti Abdul Latiff is a Malaysian actress and model. She is best known for playing the role of "Ummu Hani" in the hit 2010 drama Hani with Ryzal Jaafar, Siti Fathiyah Ibrahim, Nurul Elfira Loy and Esma Daniel. She also played the role as "Nabila", best friend of "Nur Amina" (playing role by Tiz Zaqyah) in the hit 2009 drama Nur Kasih which brought her name as an actress. In addition to main roles, she has shone in supporting roles and more recently, in comic roles.

Career

In 2009, Fathia was a supporting role in the hit 2009 drama Nur Kasih alongside leading stage actress Tiz Zaqyah, Fizz Fairuz and Remy Ishak.

In 2011, she then appeared in Al-Hijab, a Malaysian horror movie produced by Empat Samudera Plantation Sdn Bhd. She acted as Qiss, Rafael's girlfriend led by Pierre Andre. This movie was released on 6 October 2011 In the same year, she also starred as supporting actress and comic roles in Nasi Lemak 2.0, a Malaysian film directed by and starring Wee Meng Chee or nicknamed as Namewee. In this movie, her character was the second wife of a fisherman cast by a comedian Afdlin Shauki and was released on 8 September 2011. In addition, she starred in a different light as the main negative role in Bertaut Kasih, together with Ryzal Jaafar again and Fyda Ibrahim (a cousin of a Malaysian singer, Siti Nurhaliza).

In between 2009-2013 she migrated towards comic roles in dramas and telemovies such as Bila Musang Berjanggut, Ms. Cinta, Cinta Halal and Diandra.

In the year 2014, she starred as leading role in Ariana Rose, the drama based on the novel of The Wedding Breaker by Evelyn Rose.

And the year 2015, she acted in Darah Panas, produced by White Merpati Entertainment Sdn. Bhd.

Filmography

Drama

Telemovie

Discography

Awards

References

External links
 

Living people
Malaysian people of Malay descent
Malaysian people of Arab descent
Malaysian people of Indonesian descent
Malaysian film actresses
1987 births
People from Penang
Malaysian female models
21st-century Malaysian actresses
Malaysian television actresses